Rose Creek Township is a township in Republic County, Kansas, United States.

History
Rose Creek Township takes its name from the Rose Creek, in the northeastern part.

References

Townships in Republic County, Kansas
Townships in Kansas